Razadarit Ayedawbon is a Burmese chronicle covering the history of Ramanya from 1287 to 1421. The chronicle consists of accounts of court intrigues, rebellions, diplomatic missions, wars etc. About half of the chronicle is devoted to the reign of King Razadarit (r. 1384–1421), detailing the great king's struggles in the Forty Years' War against King Minkhaung I and Crown Prince Minye Kyawswa of Ava.

It is the Burmese translation of the first half of the Hanthawaddy Chronicle from Mon by Binnya Dala, an ethnic Mon minister and general of Toungoo Dynasty. It is likely the earliest extant text regarding the history of the Mon people in Lower Burma, probably the only surviving portion of the original Mon language chronicle, which was destroyed in 1565 when a rebellion burned down Pegu (Bago).

Four oldest palm-leaf manuscript copies, conjecturally dated to the mid 18th century, of the original Binnya Dala translation have survived. In all, nine slightly different versions of the chronicle existed according to a 1968 analysis by Nai Pan Hla. Pan Hla re-translated one of the versions back to Mon in 1958. He also wrote a new (tenth) version in 1968, synthesizing the Burmese versions of Razadarit, the version of Pak Lat Chronicles, and the accounts in Hmannan as well as modern research.

References

Bibliography
 
 
 
 

Burmese chronicles
1560s books